Étrigny is a commune in the eastern French department of Saône-et-Loire.

Population

See also
Communes of the Saône-et-Loire department

References

Communes of Saône-et-Loire